Vitaliy Yuriyovych Vernydub (born 17 October 1987) is a Ukrainian professional footballer who plays as a centre-back for Ukrainian Premier League club Kryvbas Kryvyi Rih.

Career

Club
Vernydub is a graduate of Metalurh Zaporizhzhia Youth school system, where he was trained by Oleksandr Rudyka. He was loaned off to Kryvbas Kryvyy Rih for the second half of the 2006–2007 season, where he managed to play 9 matches for the club. Vernydub debuted for the senior Metalurh Zaporizhzhia team on 13 July 2007, at a home game against rivals Karpaty Lviv, which the club won 1–0.

Gabala
On 11 June 2015, Vernydub signed a one-year contract with Azerbaijan Premier League side Gabala FK. On 11 May 2017, Vernydub signed a new one-year contract, leaving Gabala on 31 May 2018.

Return to Zorya Luhansk
On 19 June 2018, Vernydub signed a two-year contract with Zorya Luhansk.

Return to Kryvbas Kryvyi Rih
On 2 July 2022 he moved to Kryvbas Kryvyi Rih.

International career

Personal life
His father Yuriy Vernydub is a formal coach of Kryvbas Kryvyi Rih.

Career statistics

Club

International

Statistics accurate as of match played 18 November 2014

Personal life
He is a son of the Ukrainian coach Yuriy Vernydub.

References

External links
 
 Profile on EUFO
 Profile on Football Squads

1987 births
Living people
Ukrainian footballers
FC Metalurh Zaporizhzhia players
FC Metalurh-2 Zaporizhzhia players
FC Kryvbas Kryvyi Rih players
FC Zorya Luhansk players
Ukrainian Premier League players
Ukrainian First League players
Ukrainian Second League players
Gabala FC players
Azerbaijan Premier League players
Ukrainian expatriate footballers
Expatriate footballers in Russia
Ukrainian expatriate sportspeople in Russia
Expatriate footballers in Azerbaijan
Ukrainian expatriate sportspeople in Azerbaijan
DYuSSh Smena-Zenit alumni
Ukraine international footballers
Association football defenders
Ukraine youth international footballers
Ukraine under-21 international footballers
Footballers from Zaporizhzhia